"The Greedy Ugly People" is a single by British indie rock band Hefner. Released in 2000 by Too Pure, it was the second single from their album We Love the City.

The b-side on the second compact disc, "Don’t Give Up On Us Babe", was originally recorded by David Soul, best known for his role as Hutch on the television series Starsky and Hutch.

Track listing

The single was released on four formats, two compact discs and two vinyl records.

CD1
 "The Greedy Ugly People"
 "Milkmaids"
 "Kate Cleaver’s House"

CD2
 "The Greedy Ugly People"
 "Everything is Falling Apart"
 "Don’t Give Up On Us Babe"

7"
 "The Greedy Ugly People" (Baxendale remix)
 "The Greedy Ugly People" (Electric Sound of Joy remix)

12"
 "The Greedy Ugly People" (Baxendale extended remix)

Hefner (band) songs
2000 songs
Too Pure singles